The Peace Palace is a residential skyscraper located in Daan District, Taipei, Taiwan.

The residential building is located in close proximity to National Taiwan Normal University and offers 106 luxury apartments units, which successfully appealed to the Taiwanese singer and songwriter Jay Chou, who bought the topmost floor of the building, which has a view of the cityscape of Taipei.

Design 
Designed by the Taiwanese architect C.T. Chen, the exterior design was based upon the neo-classical style, with a crown-shaped roof bearing a symbolical resemblance to a mighty king on his throne. The entire building is constructed out of Brazilian gold granite. Structurally, it is a super-seismic residence, which adopts SS steel frame system design. The total steel consumption is up to 9,000 tonnes. In addition, 272 Japanese KYB hydraulic dampers are added to effectively improve wind resistance and Seismic coefficient, meeting the requirements of preventing earthquakes and typhoons common in Taiwan.

The tower has been awarded Honorable Mention in Architectural Design / Tall Buildings by the Architecture MasterPrize as well as Silver in Interior Design / Exterior Lighting by International Design Awards.

See also 
 List of tallest buildings in Taipei
 Tao Zhu Yin Yuan
 One Park Taipei
 Huaku Sky Garden
 55 Timeless

References

2014 establishments in Taiwan
Residential skyscrapers in Taiwan
Skyscrapers in Taipei
Apartment buildings in Taiwan
Residential buildings completed in 2014